Marie Ruggeri (born Maria Christina Ruggeri, 21 July 1952 in Déifferdeng), professionally known as Mary Christy, frequently credited as Mary Cristy, is a Luxembourgish singer and actress.

Ruggeri grew up in Mamer, where her father worked as an entrepreneur. In the 1960s she was a child singer in Luxembourg and Germany where she appeared under the pseudonyms Marie Tina and Marie Christina.

In the early 1970s, she moved to Paris where she performed under the name Mary Christy, and participated in the rock opera La Révolution Française by Schönberg at the Palais des Sports in Paris.

She is best known for representing Monaco in the Eurovision Song Contest 1976 with the song "Toi, la musique et moi". Her entry received 93 points, ranking 3rd out of 18 participants.

References

Living people
1952 births
Luxembourgian emigrants to France
Eurovision Song Contest entrants for Monaco
Eurovision Song Contest entrants of 1976
People from Differdange